is a 2015 Japanese film written and directed by Kōji Fukada and based on a play by Oriza Hirata. Starring Bryerly Long and Geminoid F, the film was promoted as "the first movie to feature a Gynoid performing opposite a human actor". It premiered in October 2015 at the Tokyo International Film Festival and was scheduled for release in Japan on November 21, 2015.

Cast
Bryerly Long as Tanya
Geminoid F
Hirofumi Arai
Makiko Murata
Nijirō Murakami
Yukio Kibiki
Jérôme Kircher
Irene Jacob
Noémie Nakai

Release
The world premiere of the film was in October 2015, at the Tokyo International Film Festival. It is scheduled for release in Japan on November 21, 2015.

Reception

Critical reception
Peter Debruge of Variety called the film a "dreary study of human-robot relations [that] offers little to engage apart from its pretty scenery."

Deborah Young of The Hollywood Reporter called the film a "dark, hopeless and pretty depressing [...] post-apocalyptic Japanese mood piece".

Accolades
The film was in competition at the 2015 Tokyo International Film Festival.

References

External links
 

2015 films
2010s Japanese films
2015 science fiction films
2010s English-language films
Japanese films based on plays
2010s French-language films
2010s German-language films
2010s Japanese-language films
Japanese post-apocalyptic films
Japanese science fiction films
2015 multilingual films
Japanese multilingual films